Yicheng Subdistrict is a subdistrict of China in Baohe District, Hefei, Anhui, China. , it administers Yicheng Community, Yinghuai Community, Qianyang Village, Beixu Village, and Wangliao Village.

See also 
 List of township-level divisions of Anhui

References 

Township-level divisions of Anhui
Hefei